Red Church may refer to:

 Red Church (Vourgareli), Tzoumerka, Pindus 
 Red Church (Brno) in Brno, Czech Republic
 Red Church (Bulgaria) near Perushtitsa, Bulgaria
 Red Church (Olomouc) in Olomouc, Czech Republic
 Red Church (Güzelyurt), ruined church in Cappadocia, Turkey
 Church of Saints Simon and Helena in Minsk, Belarus
 The former First Methodist Episcopal Church in Port Hope, Michigan
 St. James Episcopal Church in Sonora, California
The centenary Methodist Church, Baroda